Abdulla Hassan Saif is a Bahraini banker and politician. He served as minister of finance of Bahrain from May 1999 to January 2005. Since leaving office, he has acted as vice chairman of The Islamic Bank of Asia.

References

External links

Bahraini politicians
Living people
Year of birth missing (living people)